The Museo Municipal de Bellas Artes de Santa Cruz de Tenerife is a museum of fine arts located in the city of Santa Cruz de Tenerife (Tenerife, Canary Islands, Spain). Its headquarters are located in the rear of the Church of St. Francis of Assisi.

The museum dates back to 1840, when the city agreed to make some boxes to preserve flags from the French Revolutionary Wars. The building is of a classical style and was established in early 1929 by the architect Eladio Laredo. The exterior is decorated with ten different busts of the illustrious of Tenerife.

The museum has fourteen rooms that have a background as a repository of works from the Prado Museum in Madrid. The museum houses an art collection ranging from sixteenth-century Flemish to twentieth-century paintings, as well as a sample of sculptures and crafts. The "Tríptico de Nava y Grimón" by the Flemish painter Pieter Coecke is one of the most notable parts of the collection. Other noteworthy works are those by Canarian painter Juan de Miranda, Afonso Gaspar de Quevedo, Jose Rivera and Cristóbal Hernández de Quintana, among others.

Gallery

External links 

 Official site
 Ayuntamiento de Santa Cruz de Tenerife

Museums in Tenerife
Buildings and structures in Santa Cruz de Tenerife
Museums established in 1840
Tenerife
Neoclassical architecture in Spain
1840 establishments in Spain
Art museums established in 1840
Bien de Interés Cultural landmarks in the Province of Santa Cruz de Tenerife